The Bundesstraße 224 or B 224 is a German federal highway in North Rhine-Westphalia.

Route description 
The B 224 runs from Raesfeld in southern Münsterland through the city of Gelsenkirchen in the Ruhr area and Essen in the Bergische Land, and ending in Solingen.

From the Gelsenkirchen-Hassel junction the B 224 continues on the A 52, which ends shortly before Gladbeck and continues as the B 224.

After joining with the A 44 at the Velbert-Nord interchange, the B 224 becomes concurrent with the A 535, splitting off before the Sonnborner Kreuz interchange, continuing into Solingen, where it continues as the B 229.

Route / Junctions

See also 
List of federal highways in Germany

References 

224
Roads in North Rhine-Westphalia